Paul Stephens (born April 23, 1987) is an American football defensive back who is currently a free agent. He played college football at University of Central Missouri and attended Hightower High School in Missouri City, Texas.

Early life
Stephens attended Hightower High School where he played football and basketball.

College career
Stephens played for the Blinn Buccaneers from 2005 to 2007. Stephens transferred to Arkansas State played in 2008 with the Red Wolves before he was dismissed from the team. Stephens played for the Central Missouri Mules in 2010. He was the team's starter his only year and helped the Mules to 11 wins. He played in 23 games during his career including 4 starts at cornerback.

Professional career

Spokane Shock
Stephens was assigned to the Spokane Shock on February 22, 2012. Stephens returned to the Shock in 2013. Stephens recorded 12 interceptions in 2013, including 5 on April 19, 2013 against the San Jose SaberCats.

BC Lions
Stephens signed with the BC Lions of the Canadian Football League in May 2014. Stephens failed to make the Lions and was cut on June 1, 2014.

Orlando Predators
On January 9, 2015, Stephens was assigned to the Orlando Predators. On February 15, 2016, Stephens returned to the Predators for another season.

Tampa Bay Storm
Stephens was assigned to the Tampa Bay Storm on May 2, 2017.

References

External links
 Central Missouri bio

Living people
1987 births
Players of American football from Texas
People from Missouri City, Texas
American football defensive backs
Blinn Buccaneers football players
Arkansas State Red Wolves football players
Central Missouri Mules football players
Spokane Shock players
Orlando Predators players
Tampa Bay Storm players